James Oliver Charles Tomkins (born 29 March 1989) is an English professional footballer who plays as a centre back for  club Crystal Palace. He has represented England at all levels up to the under-21 team and represented Great Britain at the 2012 London Olympics. He is a product of the West Ham youth academy.

Club career

West Ham United

Early years and club debut

Aged seven, Tomkins was spotted while playing for his local Sunday League side and signed into West Ham United's youth academy. Initially a striker, he eventually switched to his current position in central defence. He signed scholarship forms in 2005. Prior to making his first-team debut, his career had been marred by several injuries.

Tomkins made his Premier League debut on 22 March 2008 in a 1–1 draw away to Everton. Although his costly slip allowed Yakubu to score the opening goal, He made five more starts and a substitute appearance. As first choice centre backs James Collins, Danny Gabbidon and Matthew Upson were all out injured during various times in the season, he enjoyed an extended run in the first team for the remainder of the season, winning the Young Hammer of the Year for 2007–08.

2008–09 season
On 27 November, Tomkins signed for Derby County on a five-week loan spell. He made his debut for Derby in their 3–0 away defeat to Burnley on 29 November 2008. He played 8 times in all competitions for Derby County during his loan spell, before being recalled to West Ham on 31 December 2008 by manager Gianfranco Zola.
After his stint with Derby, he started to feature regularly with the Hammers first-team. On 21 March 2009, he started and played the full 90 minutes alongside Jonathan Spector in a 1–1 draw with Blackburn Rovers at Ewood Park. Initially desputising for the injured Collins, he managed to stake his claim ahead of the Welsh international, and on 4 April 2009, scored his first senior goal, a header from Mark Noble's corner, in a 2–0 win over Sunderland. The same month, he and several fellow youth products were awarded long-term contract extensions.

2009–10 season
After the departure of James Collins and with Danny Gabbidon injured, Tomkins retained his place in the starting eleven at the beginning of the 2009–10 season, losing it to new signing Manuel da Costa for several games. He regained his place, starting alongside captain Matthew Upson. He was named Man of the Match by Sky Sports as he and Upson helped keep the Hammers' first clean sheet of the year in the away draw against Aston Villa on 17 January 2010.

2010–11 season
Tomkins made 28 appearances in all competitions in the 2010–11 season scoring once against Manchester City at Upton Park. On 1 January 2011, he made his 50th first-team appearance for West Ham in a 2–0 victory over Wolverhampton Wanderers.

2011–12 season
It was the 2011–12 season that Tomkins found his feet in the West Ham United first team, forging a partnership at the back with New Zealand's Winston Reid. He scored the first goal in the 4–0 win against Watford at Vicarage Road and also received WHUFC player of the month for August, the opening month of the season. During the 2011–12 season, he was linked with a £4 million move to both Queens Park Rangers and Newcastle United of the Premier League, but the speculation soon ended about his future when he signed a new four-and-a-half-year deal at West Ham on 21 January running until summer 2016. After signing he also proved his commitment and love for the club by saying "I'm a local boy and have come through the ranks at the club and loyalty is a far bigger currency to me than money". For his outstanding performance in the 2011–12 Championship season he was voted by his fellow professionals into the PFA Championship Team of the Year, along with fellow Hammer Mark Noble. He was also voted runner-up Hammer of the Year by West Ham fans, losing out to Mark Noble.

2014–15 season
In 2015, Tomkins signed a new, long-term contract which would keep him with West Ham until 2020. Shortly after he dislocated his shoulder in training, an injury which was expected to keep him from playing for several weeks. In March, he received surgery for the same injury. He played 25 games in all competitions for West Ham including three FA Cup games. He scored a single goal, in a 2–1 away win against West Bromwich Albion on 2 December 2014. His shoulder injury kept him out of the side from March 2015, finally returning for the last game of the season, replacing Reece Burke in the 69th minute, a 2–0 away defeat to Newcastle United.

2015–16 season
Tomkins opened the 2015–16 season by scoring the third goal in a UEFA Europa League game on 2 July 2015. West Ham won the game against Andorran team Lusitanos 3–0 with him as captain and with the other goals coming from Diafra Sakho. On 16 July 2015, he scored another UEFA Europa League goal in the 1–0 win over Bikirkara in the 90th minute. In the second-leg, in Malta, on 23 July 2015, he was sent-off after pushing Birkirkara's Nikola Vukanac as West Ham went through to the next round, 5–3 on penalties.

Crystal Palace
On 5 July 2016, Tomkins joined London rivals Crystal Palace on a five-year deal for a fee of £10 million. He had played for West Ham for over 20 years from boyhood right up to 2016, he made 243 appearances for West Ham's senior team. In October 2019, Tomkins signed a contract extension keeping him at Crystal Palace until the end of the 2021–22 season  and in June 2022, signed a further extension keeping him at the club until 2023.

International career

England U21
Tomkins has represented England at U15, U16, U17, U19 and U21 levels and played in every match of the 2008 UEFA U-19 Championships along with club mate Freddie Sears. His U21 debut came on 8 June 2009 in the 7–0 home win against the Azerbaijan U21 team. He was called up for the 2009 UEFA U-21 Championships as back up after the withdrawals of first-choice centre backs Steven Taylor and David Wheater through injury. After the tournament, he was recalled to the squad and regularly partnered Michael Mancienne in defence. He was called up for several European Championship qualifiers but withdrew after being ruled out with an injury sustained during training.

Great Britain Olympic team
After the success of the 2011–12 Championship season, where Tomkins was named in the PFA Championship Team of the Year and was the runner-up for the Hammer of the Year, he was called for the final squad for Great Britain's Olympic football squad for the London Olympics 2012. He played twice for the Great Britain Team. On 20 July 2012 he played the first half in a 2–0 defeat to Brazil in a warm-up game and on 29 July 2012 in a 3–1 victory against UAE. He blamed his inclusion in the Olympic squad and lack of games on a loss of form at the start of the 2012–13 West Ham season.

Personal life
Tomkins was born in Basildon, Essex. On 23 December 2013 Tomkins was charged with the assault of a police officer, resisting arrest and being drunk and disorderly following an incident on 22 December at the Sugar Hut nightclub in Brentwood, Essex. He was bailed until 9 January 2014 to appear at Basildon Magistrates Court. Tomkins averted the need for a trial by pleading guilty to assaulting a police constable, being drunk and disorderly in a public place and obstructing a constable. On 29 September 2014, he was fined £7605.

Career statistics

Honours
West Ham United
Football League Championship play-offs: 2012

Individual
PFA Team of the Year: 2011–12 Championship

References

External links

West Ham United Profile at whufc.com
Crystal Palace Profile at cpfc.co.uk

Premier League profile

1989 births
Living people
Sportspeople from Basildon
English footballers
England youth international footballers
England under-21 international footballers
Association football defenders
West Ham United F.C. players
Derby County F.C. players
Crystal Palace F.C. players
Premier League players
English Football League players
Olympic footballers of Great Britain
Footballers at the 2012 Summer Olympics
English people convicted of assault
Sportspeople convicted of crimes